Etobicoke West was a provincial electoral district in Ontario, Canada. It was created prior to the 1987 provincial election and eliminated in 1996, when its territory was incorporated into the riding of Etobicoke Centre. Etobicoke West riding was created from the central part of York West. It was in the former borough of Etobicoke.

Two Members of Provincial Parliament represented the riding during its history. The most notable was Chris Stockwell who served in cabinet during the Mike Harris/Ernie Eve governments.

Members of Provincial Parliament

Electoral results

References

Notes

Citations

Former provincial electoral districts of Ontario
Provincial electoral districts of Toronto
Etobicoke